Hydrangea kwangsiensis is a species of Hydrangea, native to China.

References

External links
 Hydrangea kwangsiensis at efloras.org.

kwangsiensis
Flora of China
Plants described in 1931